Lou Rae is a Tasmanian author and historian of the West Coast of Tasmania.

His publications have included articles about Rosebery, Tasmania, the Emu Bay Railway Queenstown, Tasmania and the Mount Lyell Railway otherwise known as the Abt Railway, as well as the Sandfly Colliery Tramway.

His publications about railways on the west coast of Tasmania have gone into multiple editions, as well as modifying for the changes in the fate of the railways.

He also has been a postgraduate student at the University of Tasmania, culminating in his 2005 PhD thesis about the Mount Lyell area.

His session at The Unconformity event in Queenstown in October 2016 addresses the issues of sources and historiography of the Western Tasmanian region.

Publications

Notes

Living people
Australian historians
Writers from Tasmania
Railway historians
Western Tasmania
Year of birth missing (living people)